Joseph Philip Blahak (August 29, 1950 – April 25, 2016) was a professional football player, a defensive back for several National Football League (NFL) teams in the mid-1970s.  He played college football at the University of Nebraska in Lincoln under head coach Bob Devaney, and was a member of the 1970 and 1971 undefeated national championship teams.

Early years
Born and raised in Columbus, Nebraska, Blahak played football for its Scotus Central Catholic High School and graduated in 1969.

Collegiate career
During his junior season at Nebraska in 1971, #27 Blahak was involved in a controversial play on national television. In the first quarter of the "Game of the Century" against #2 Oklahoma on Thanksgiving, he was accused of clipping Sooner punter Joe Wylie halfway through a 72-yard punt return for a touchdown by Johnny Rodgers, but was not penalized. Blahak forced a fumble and recovered another in the game. He also ended Alabama's best scoring chance in the Orange Bowl by intercepting a Terry Davis pass in the end zone; Nebraska crushed the #2 Crimson Tide  for a  record and the consensus national title.

NFL career
Blahak was one of ten Huskers selected in the 1973 NFL Draft, taken in the eighth round by the Houston Oilers, the 183rd overall pick. He was claimed off waivers the next year by the Minnesota Vikings, where he played two years before going to the newly formed Tampa Bay Buccaneers in the 1976 NFL Expansion Draft. Blahak was an opening-day starter for the Bucs, but only played with the team for two games. He was one of two players cut to make room for newly signed receiver Morris Owens, and running back Rod McNeill. He was picked up toward the end of the season by the New England Patriots, and returned to the Vikings in 1977 before retiring.

Personal life
On November 28, 1970, he married Diane Melliger of Columbus and they had three children. After his NFL career, he returned to Lincoln and worked for an insurance company. He died suddenly at age 65 of an apparent heart attack.

Awards
 1st team All-Big Eight, 1971
 AP and UPI 2nd-team All-American, 1972

References

External links
 Husker Max - interview with Joe Blahak - 2004
 
 

1950 births
2016 deaths
American football cornerbacks
Houston Oilers players
Minnesota Vikings players
Nebraska Cornhuskers football players
New England Patriots players
Tampa Bay Buccaneers players
All-American college football players
People from Columbus, Nebraska
Players of American football from Nebraska